Firuzabadi also spelled as al-Fayrūzabādī ( (1329–1414) was a lexicographer and was the compiler of al-Qamous, a comprehensive and,  for nearly five centuries, one of the most widely used Arabic dictionaries.

Name
He was Abū al-Ṭāhir Majīd al-Dīn Muḥammad ibn Ya'qūb ibn Muḥammad ibn Ibrāhīm al-Shīrāzī al-Fīrūzābādī, known simply as Muḥammad ibn Ya'qūb al-Fīrūzābādī. His nisbas "al-Shīrāzī" and "al-Fīrūzābādī" refer to the cities of Shiraz (located near Kazerun, his place of birth) and Firuzabad (his father's hometown) in Fars, Persia, respectively.

Life
Firuzabadi, of Persian origin, was born in Kazerun, Fars, Persia, and educated in Shiraz, Wasit, Baghdad and Damascus. He spent ten years in Jerusalem before travelling in Western Asia and Egypt, and settling in 1368, in Mecca for almost three decades.  From Mecca he visited Delhi in the 1380s. He left Mecca in the mid-1390s and returned to Baghdad, then Shiraz (where he was received by Timur) and finally travelled on to Ta'izz in Yemen. In 1395, he was appointed chief qadi (judge) of Yemen by Al-Ashraf Umar II, who had summoned him from India a few years before to teach in his capital. Al-Ashraf's marriage to a daughter of Firūzābādī added to Firuzabadi's prestige and power in the royal court.
In his latter years, Firūzābādī converted his house at Mecca, and appointed three teachers, to a school of Maliki law.

Sufism and relations with Ibn Arabi
Ibn Arabi's works inspired Firūzābādī's intense interest in Sufism.

Selected works
 ("The Surrounding Ocean"); his principal literary legacy is this voluminous dictionary, which amalgamates and supplements two great dictionaries; Al-Muhkam by Ibn Sida (d. 1066) and Al-ʿUbab by al-Saghānī (d. 1252).  Al-Saghānī's dictionary had itself supplemented the seminal medieval Arabic dictionary of Al-Jawharī (d. ca. 1008), titled al-Sihah. Firūzābādī also produced a concise simplified edition using a terse notation system and omitting grammatical examples of usage and some rarer definitions. The larger-print-two-volume concise dictionary proved much more popular than the vast Lisan al-Arab dictionary of Ibn Manzur (d. 1312) with its numerous quotations and usage examples.
Al-Bulghah fī tārīkh a'immat al-lughah (Damascus 1972, in Arabic).

References

External Links
 Searchable Online Version Firuzabadi, al-Qāmūs al-Muḥīṭ القاموس المحيط للفيروزآبادي, The Arabic Lexicon

Further reading

Vivian Strotmann, Majd al-Dīn al-Fīrūzābādī (1329–1415): A Polymath on the Eve of the Early Modern Period, Islamic History and Civilization, Volume 121 (Brill, 2015).
Arabic Lexicography: Its History, and Its Place in the General History of Lexicography, by John Haywood, year 1965
Baheth.info  has a searchable copy of Firuzabadi's al-Qāmūs al-Muḥīṭ dictionary
 

1329 births
People from Kazerun
Iranian writers
1414 deaths
Medieval grammarians of Arabic
Iranian lexicographers
Iranian grammarians
Linguists from Iran
Supporters of Ibn Arabi
Lexicographers of Arabic
15th-century lexicographers
14th-century lexicographers
14th-century Iranian people
15th-century Iranian people